The 1996 presidential elections in Latvia took place on June 18, 1996. Guntis Ulmanis was re-elected President of Latvia . According to the Satversme , the President was elected by the 6th Saeima.

Candidates

Election process and results 
There was a scandal surrounding the election due to the fact that one of the nominated presidential candidates, Alfrēds Rubiks, was in prison at that time, thus there was an active debate on this issue in the previous Saeima sittings before the presidential elections. It was also decided to extend the president's term from three to four years, but only from the next presidential election onwards. In the first round of voting, one of the candidates, incumbent President Guntis Ulmanis collected the necessary number of votes to be re-elected President of Latvia.

References

Presidential elections in Latvia
Latvia
1996 in Latvia